Artificial reproduction is the creation of new life by other than the natural means available to an organism. Examples include artificial insemination, in vitro fertilization, cloning and embryonic splitting, or cleavage.

Cutting plants' stems and placing them in compost is also a form of artificial reproduction.

References
www.cmf.org

See also
Male Pregnancy
Artificial Uterus
In Vitro Fertilization
Fertilization
Pregnancy

Reproduction